Neckermann Versand AG is a former German mail order company founded by Josef Neckermann in 1950. It was one of the leading mail order companies in Europe.

History 

Neckermann Versand AG was founded on April 1, 1950 by Josef Neckermann.

In 1978, Neckermann tried to gain a foothold in the gaming industry by releasing the Tele-Cassetten Game under their technology and multimedia home brand Palladium. From 1995, the company operated its own online shop at neckermann.de, through which almost 80 percent of sales were processed. The range consisted of over 700,000 articles from fashion, household, toy and technology segments. Since October 8, 2010, Neckermann is 100 percent owned by Sun Capital Partners.

The bankruptcy proceedings were officially opened on October 1, 2012. Since February 4, 2013, Otto Group maintains an online mail order company at neckermann.de.

Further reading 
 Thomas Veszelits: Die Neckermanns. Licht und Schatten einer deutschen Unternehmerfamilie. Campus, Frankfurt 2005, 
 Patricia Wiede: Josef Neckermann. Ullstein, München 2000, 
 Excerpts: „Hochgesteckte Ziele“ und „Ich wollte etwas ganz Großes“
 Josef Neckermann, Harvey T. Rowe, Karin Weingart: Erinnerungen. Ullstein, Frankfurt 1990, 
 Eckhard F. Schröter: Josef Neckermann. FN-Verlag, Warendorf 1984, 
 Franz Lerner: Frankfurt am Main und seine Wirtschaft. Ammelburg, Frankfurt 1958
 Steffen Radlmaier: Die Joel-Story. Billy Joel und seine deutsch-jüdische Familiengeschichte. Heyne, München 2009, .
 Steffen Radlmaier: Neckermann und der „Wäschejude“. Wie Karl Joel um sein Lebenswerk gebracht wurde, in Matthias Henkel und Eckart Dietzfelbinger (Hrsg.): Entrechtet. Entwürdigt. Beraubt: Die Arisierung in Nürnberg und Fürth, Michael Imhof Verlag, Petersberg 2012,  (Begleitbuch zur Ausstellung des Dokumentationszentrums Reichsparteitagsgelände)
 Hans Steidle: Neckermann & Co. Die Ausplünderung der Würzburger Juden im Dritten Reich. Echter Verlag Würzburg 2014,

References

External links 
 
  (in German)

Mail-order retailers
Online retailers of Germany
German companies established in 1950